The Best Science Fiction Stories: 1950 is a 1950 anthology of science fiction short stories edited by Everett F. Bleiler and T. E. Dikty.  An abridged edition was published in the UK by Grayson in 1951 under the title The Best Science Fiction Stories.  The stories had originally appeared in 1949 in the magazines Astounding, The Saturday Evening Post, Fantasy and Science Fiction, Fantastic Adventures, Maclean’s, Thrilling Wonder Stories, Blue Book and Startling Stories. The anthology was later combined with the 1949 volume and reissued as Science Fiction Omnibus.

Contents

 A Sort of Introduction, by Vincent Starrett
 Preface, by Everett F. Bleiler & T. E. Dikty
 "Private Eye", by Henry Kuttner
 "Doomsday Deferred", by Will F. Jenkins
 "The Hurkle Is a Happy Beast", by Theodore Sturgeon
 "Eternity Lost", by Clifford Simak
 "Easter Eggs", by Robert Spencer Carr
 "Opening Doors", by Wilmar H. Shiras
 "Five Years in the Marmalade", by Robert W. Krepps
 "Dwellers in Silence", by Ray Bradbury
 "Mouse", by Fredric Brown
 "Refuge for Tonight", by Robert Moore Williams
 "The Life-Work of Professor Muntz", by Murray Leinster
 "Flaw", by John D. MacDonald
 "The Man", by Ray Bradbury
 About the Authors

Reception
P. Schuyler Miller received the anthology favorably, praising "the literary taste and broad knowledge of the field shown by its editors."

References

Sources

1950 anthologies
Best Science Fiction Stories 1950